Leithead is a surname. Notable people with this surname include:

 Alastair Leithead (born 1972), British journalist 
 J. Edward Leithead, American writer